

57001–57100 

|-bgcolor=#f2f2f2
| colspan=4 align=center | 
|}

57101–57200 

|-id=140
| 57140 Gaddi ||  || Riccardo Gaddi, amateur astronomer and popular expositor || 
|}

57201–57300 

|-bgcolor=#f2f2f2
| colspan=4 align=center | 
|}

57301–57400 

|-id=359
| 57359 Robcrawford || 2001 RC || Robert W. Crawford, American energy and environmental consultant, amateur astronomer and physicist || 
|}

57401–57500 

|-id=424
| 57424 Caelumnoctu ||  || (19)57–4–24, 1957 April 24, is the date of the transmission of the first edition of the BBC television series The Sky at Night (Caelum noctu in Latin) || 
|-id=471
| 57471 Mariemarsina ||  || Marie Marsina (born 1952) currently serves as the President of the National Art League in New York City and as Vice President of the Douglaston Civic Association. She is a graduate of Pace University's Lubin School of Business. || 
|}

57501–57600 

|-id=509
| 57509 Sly ||  || Sylvestre (Sly) Maurice (born 1966), a planetary astronomer specialized in lunar and Martian exploration. He has been a lead-developer of Martian rover instruments. || 
|-id=567
| 57567 Crikey ||  || Steve Irwin (1962–2006), an Australian zookeeper and conservationist, known for his TV-series The Crocodile Hunter. "Crikey!", was his signature phrase. || 
|}

57601–57700 

|-id=658
| 57658 Nilrem ||  || Jean-Claude Merlin (born 1954), French astronomer, founder-president of the Burgundy Astronomical Society and discoverer of minor planets. "Nilrem" is "Merlin" backwards, because of pre-existing . || 
|}

57701–57800 

|-bgcolor=#f2f2f2
| colspan=4 align=center | 
|}

57801–57900 

|-id=868
| 57868 Pupin || 2001 YD || Mihajlo Pupin (1858–1935), a Serbian-American physicist and humanitarian. || 
|-id=879
| 57879 Cesarechiosi ||  || Cesare Chiosi, Italian professor of theoretical astrophysics at the University of Padua || 
|}

57901–58000 

|-
| 57901 Hitchens ||  || Christopher Hitchens (1949–2011) was a social, religious and literary critic of broad interests, who listed "disputation" among his hobbies || 
|}

References 

057001-058000